Jeremy Clements Racing, formerly known as Jeremy Clements Motorsports, is an American professional stock car racing team. The team currently fields the No. 51 Chevrolet Camaro SS full-time for Jeremy Clements in the NASCAR Xfinity Series with crew chief Mark Setzer. Based in Spartanburg, South Carolina, the team was founded in 2010, and is owned by driver Jeremy Clements and his father Tony. The team has fielded cars in the Xfinity Series for Clements, Ty Dillon (loaning the No. 51 entry to Richard Childress Racing), and Ryan Sieg.

History

Car No. 51 history
In 2008, Jeremy Clements attempted the Dollar General 300 but failed to qualify. He did, however, qualify for the next race, the Missouri-Illinois Dodge Dealers 250, and debuted for Jeremy Clements Motorsports in the No. 50 car. He finished 22nd. 2009 would see them increase in made races from the previous years. In six starts, Clements would improve on the team's best career finish, from 22nd to 16th at Gateway, where the team had debuted the year earlier. 2010 would see the Clements family step away from fielding an independent team to collaborate with JD Motorsports. Clements would miss six of his twenty-two attempts in the No. 04, but he would also get his first top 10, again at Gateway. 2011 would see him go back to fielding his team. He would attempt the full schedule for the first time, in a new No. 51. He would succeed, attaining three top 15's on the way to a top 15 points finish. 

In 2012, for both the Virginia 529 College Savings 250, and the Lilly Diabetes 250, Jeremy Clements fielded the No. 4 entry for Jeremy Clements Racing, the successor to Jeremy Clements Motorsports, in place of the regular 51, as Richard Childress Racing used it for Ty Dillon. Ty finished 3rd and 7th, respectively. Clements would improve over last season with two top 10's and five top 15's, finishing 14th in the points standings. In 2013, Jeremy Clements missed both the Dollar General 200 and the Sam's Town 300. Ryan Sieg filled in the No. 51 for both races, with the events being his first two Xfinity Series starts. He finished 21st and 18th, respectively. Clements would continue to perform, with two top 10's and three top 15's. Despite missing two races and having fewer stellar finishes, he would only fall to 16th in the standings. 2014-15 would see Clements accumulate three top 10's, almost finishing in the top 5 at Elkhart Lake in 2014. His best points finish during this stretch tied the team's best of 14th. By this point, the No. 51 had become known for their consistency in both race and season points finishes.

In the inaugural season of the Xfinity Series Chase (2016), Clements finished 15th in points, just 3 positions outside of the lowest spot in the Chase, 12th. This season would also see Clements Racing finish top 5 for the first time, a 4th at the spring Talladega race. They would also finish top 10 two additional times On August 27, 2017, Clements won the Johnsonville 180 at Road America, after a collision with Matt Tifft while coming to the white flag. This victory was the first victory for Clements, JCR, and the 51 team, and locked the 51 into the first round of the 2017 Xfinity Series Chase, the Round of 12. However, Clements would miss the round of 8 and finish last in the Chase. Despite this relative disappointment, the win and subsequent points finish was the breakout moment that JCR had been looking for after only finishing top 10 once up until that point in the season and never finishing higher than 14th in the points. 2018 would be a return to business as usual, as Jeremy Clements would have two more top 10 finishes en route to another top 15 points finish. Their best finish was an 8th at Richmond.

Before the 2019 NASCAR Xfinity Series season, JCR purchased chassis from the shuttered Chip Ganassi Racing Xfinity Series program, intending to run top-fifteen to top-ten consistently with the new cars. This prediction would prove accurate, as the No. 51 team would see a marked increase in production. With one top 5 and four top 10's, including a 6th at the fall Kansas race, the highs were certainly higher. However, the team would again finish in 14th for the final points standings.

During the 2020 season, the team was fined $10,000 for an undisclosed violation of NASCAR's COVID-19 protocols; the penalty was upheld after an appeal by the team. On September 23, 2020, JCR announced it has parted ways with longtime sponsor RepairableVehicles.com, ending a partnership that lasted for 10 years. The team will look for new sponsors for the remainder of the season and 2021. None of this seemed to slow down the JCR team, however, as they would hold strong with one top 5 and five top 10's. His season-best finish of 3rd at Pocono was the best finish for the No. 51 since his win three years earlier, but they would just miss out on the Playoffs by finishing 13th in the final points standings. 2021 would see Clements get off to one of the hottest starts in his career,  as through the first eight races he would accumulate three top-10's while finishing an astonishing 99.8% of the scheduled laps. This hot streak would help solve his previous sponsorship woes, as First Pacific Funding would sign on to sponsor him for the rest of the season.

During the 2022 season, Clements scored his second career win at the Daytona night race. However, NASCAR issued the team an L2 penalty four days later after the post-race inspection discovered an illegally modified intake manifold. Clements kept the win, but was declared ineligible for the playoffs. In addition, crew chief Mark Setzer was fined 60,000 and the team was docked 75 owner and driver points, plus 10 playoff points should the team qualify for the postseason. Clements's appeal was heard on September 13; panel members Tom DeLoach, Richard Gore and Dixon Johnston found in Clements's favor, rescinding the penalty and revoking the punishments. As a result, he regained his eligibility for the 2022 playoffs. On October 18, Setzer was suspended for one race and fined 25,000 for an L1 Penalty under Section 14.4.B.E, which deals with the modification of a composite body part following the Las Vegas race. In addition, the No. 51 has been docked 40 driver and owner points.

Car No. 51 results 

1 – Was fielded by Richard Childress Racing but used the No. 51 owners points.

Images

References

External links

NASCAR teams
Auto racing teams established in 2010
2010 establishments in South Carolina